Ileje District is a district in Songwe Region, Tanzania.  It is bordered to the north by Mbeya Urban and Rungwe districts, to the east by Kyela District, to the northwest by Mbozi District and to the south by Zambia and Malawi.

, the population of Ileje District was 110,194.

The District Commissioner of Ileje District is Rosemary Sitaki.

Wards

Ileje District is administratively divided into 16 wards:

 Bupigu
 Chitete
 Ibaba
 Ikinga
 Isongole
 Itale
 Itumba
 Kafule
 Lubanda
 Luswisi
 Malangali
 Mbebe
 Ndola
 Ngulilo
 Ngulugulu
 Sange

Notes

Districts of Songwe Region